Tal Ben Haim (or Tal Ben Haim II, ; born 5 August 1989), also known as Tal Ben Chaim, is an Israeli footballer who plays for Maccabi Petah Tikva as a winger. He can also play in the forward position.

Early life
Ben-Haim was born in Kfar Saba, Israel, to a Jewish family. His father is former footballer Ofir Ben Haim.

Career

Maccabi Petah Tikva
Ben Haim started his career with Maccabi Petah Tikva's youth team when he was 14 years old. During the 2007–08 season he started playing for the youth ranks of the club, scoring 19 goals in the Israeli Noar Premier League, and late in the season he earned promotion to the senior team. On 3 May 2008 he made his debut for the club in a match against Bnei Yehuda Tel Aviv. He scored his first goal in the Israeli Premier League against Hapoel Tel Aviv on 24 May 2008.

In the 2008–09 season Ben Haim become a regular choice for the senior squad, and in 2009–10 he occupied the forward position in the club alongside Omer Damari. At the end of the 2011–12 summer transfer window Ben Haim was about to move to Hapoel Tel Aviv after his teammate Omer Damari has moved earlier in that period, but the deal was cut short and he remained with the club for another season. That season was a bad one for the club and eventually it was relegated to the second division.

Hapoel Tel Aviv
On 16 July 2012, Ben Haim officially signed a two-year contract with Hapoel Tel Aviv in a complicated contract that left Maccabi Petah Tikva 75% of the fees from his next transfer, alongside a release clause of €1.5 million. He made his debut for the club on his 23rd birthday, 5 August 2012, in the Toto Cup. Seven days later he scored his first goal for the club in the Toto Cup against Maccabi Netanya. On 23 August 2012 he made his first appearance in a European competition against the Luxembourg side F91 Dudelange in a match he also scored. Three days later he scored his first goal in the Israeli Premier League for Hapoel Tel Aviv against Hapoel Rishon LeZion.

Maccabi Tel Aviv
On 25 June 2013 Ben Haim was purchased by Maccabi Tel Aviv in a deal including €1.1 million and a future 25% sell-fee to Maccabi Petah Tikva, and he officially signed a four-year contract with the club. He made his debut for the club on 17 July 2013 in the 2013–14 UEFA Champions League second qualifying round match against Győri ETO FC. Ben Haim scored his first goal for the club in the second leg of the match against Győri ETO FC just one week later.

He made his debut for Maccabi in the Israeli Premier League in the first round against Hapoel Acre, providing an assist in a match won 2–0. On 28 September 2013 he scored his first league goal for Maccabi in a 3–0 victory over Ironi Kiryat Shmona. He finished his first season for Maccabi with a championship. The 2014–15 season was successful as well as he won a local Treble with Maccabi.

A season later he qualified with his team to the Champions League Group Stage for the first time in 11 years. He finished the season with 10 league goals in 31 appearances.

Sparta Prague
In June 2017, Ben Haim joined Sparta Prague on a four-year deal, reportedly worth around €1 million per season after Sparta had activated a €2.9 million release clause in Ben Haim's contract with Maccabi Tel Aviv.

International career

Ben Haim made his debut for the national team on 29 March 2011 in a UEFA Euro 2012 qualifying match against Georgia. In that match he also scored his first goal for the team, which appeared to be the winning goal, just six minutes after he was substituted into the game.

Personal life
He has exactly the same name as central defender, Tal Ben Haim, who also played for Israel and Maccabi Tel Aviv, and he is referred to in UEFA reports as Tal Ben Haim II or Tal Ben Haim Junior (because he is younger), and wears a jersey with his surname spelled as Ben Chaim to distinguish him from his fellow countryman.

Career statistics

Club

Notes

International

International goals
As of match played 9 October 2016. Israel score listed first, score column indicates score after each Ben Haim goal.

Honours

Maccabi Tel Aviv
 Israeli Premier League (2): 2012–13, 2013–14
 Israel State Cup (1): 2014–15 
 Toto Cup (2): 2014–15, 2020-21
 Israel Super Cup (1): 2020

References

External links

1989 births
Living people
Association football wingers
Israeli footballers
Israeli Jews
Israel international footballers
Maccabi Petah Tikva F.C. players
Hapoel Tel Aviv F.C. players
Maccabi Tel Aviv F.C. players
AC Sparta Prague players
Israeli Premier League players
Czech First League players
Footballers from Kfar Saba
Israeli expatriate footballers
Expatriate footballers in the Czech Republic
Israeli expatriate sportspeople in the Czech Republic